William Bunker Tubby (21 August 1858 – 1944) was an American architect who was particularly notable for his work in New York City.

Tubby was born in Des Moines, Iowa, and graduated from Brooklyn Polytechnic Institute in 1875. He worked in the architectural offices of Ebenezer L. Roberts until beginning his own firm in 1883. Continuing this practice until his retirement in 1942, Tubby became a major New York architect. He created important buildings in a variety of styles, and was especially known for his Romanesque and Dutch Revival-style designs.

The house that Tubby designed for Charles Millard Pratt at 241 Clinton Avenue (1893, located in Brooklyn's Clinton Hill Historic District) is one of the city's finest examples of Romanesque Revival architecture. His creativity and expertise can also be seen in several other Brooklyn homes: the neo-Jacobean Brooklyn Society for Ethical Culture Meeting House, the Romanesque Revival style home at 234 Lincoln Place, the Queen Anne style row at 864-872 Carroll Street, the residences of Brooklyn mayors at 405 Clinton Avenue, and the Dutch Revival house at 43 Willow Street, which Tubby himself occupied.

His institutional designs include Pratt Institute's Student Union from 1887, the Romanesque Revival style South Hall for Pratt Institute in 1892 (designated New York City Landmark), the Renaissance Revival style library building for the Pratt Institute (1896, a designated New York City Landmark), the Romanesque Revival style 83rd Police Precinct House in Brooklyn (1894–95), a designated New York Landmark) and the Flemish Revival style Wallabout Market (demolished) which was once the second-largest market in the world. As a member of the Architects' Advisory Commission for the Brooklyn Carnegie Libraries, Tubby designed five library buildings.

Outside of New York City, Tubby created designs for banks, churches, libraries, hospitals and large estates throughout the Northeast, including Waveny House in New Canaan, Connecticut, and Dunnellen Hall in Greenwich, Connecticut. The Roslyn National Bank and Trust Company Building at Roslyn, New York, was built in 1931.

Tubby lived in Brooklyn Heights at 43 Willow Street before retiring to Greenwich in his later life. A member of the Brooklyn Guild Association, he taught architecture at the Brooklyn Polytechnic Institute.

List of works
The following table presents an incomplete list of buildings designed by William Tubby, focusing on those that are extant or for which there is adequate documentation of their style. Note that most addresses link to Google Street View images of the buildings.

References

1944 deaths
Artists from Des Moines, Iowa
People from Brooklyn Heights
People from Greenwich, Connecticut
1858 births
Architects from New York City
Architects from Iowa
Architects from Connecticut
Polytechnic Institute of New York University alumni